Knockemdown Key is an island in the lower Florida Keys approximately  east of Key West.  It is northwest of Summerland Key, between Cudjoe Key and Big Torch Key. It is currently owned by retired Milwaukee Brewers Pitcher Dave Voit.

A tidal station managed by NOAA is located on the island.

Access to the island is by boat only, with the closest public ramp located at the north end of Blimp Road on Cudjoe Key.

Geography 

Knockemdown Key is located at 24° 42.9’ N and 81° 28.7’ W, north of Summerland Key and northeast of Cudjoe Key.

The island has significant mangrove growth and is populated by Key deer.

Attractions, Events, Recreation and Culture 

The island is considered one of the finest locations in the Florida Keys for sea kayaking.

References

Islands of the Florida Keys
Islands of Monroe County, Florida
Islands of Florida